Marcus Schmuck (18 April 1925 – 21 August 2005) was an Austrian mountaineer. In 1957, together with Hermann Buhl he organized the expedition, firstly envisaged and initiated by Buhl, to climb the world's 12th highest peak, the Broad Peak (8,047 metres) in the Karakoram in Pakistan. The other members of the expedition were: Fritz Wintersteller  and Kurt Diemberger. In his later years, he successfully organized and led 74 expeditions to the high mountains around the world.

First ascents

1946 Nördlicher Mandlkopf, Southwest face, V 
1948 Wildalmkirchl, South traverse, V+ 
1949 Fleischbank, direct East chimney ("Schmuckkamin"), VI    
Sommerstein, West face, 1. winter ascent 
1953 Birnhorn, South face, 1. winter ascent 
1955 Snökuppelen, North face, IV    
Falkenstein, Southeast ridge, III     
Westbyfijell, South face, III and Southeast ridge, II 
1956 Petit Dru, West face, record time 1.5 days 
Bischofsmütze direct North face, VI+
1957 Broad Peak 8047m on 9 June
Skil Brum 7420m on 19 June
1959 Hoggar Denachnet 2690m, East ridge 
1963 Koh i Sayoz 6920m    
Koh i Shogordok 6855m 
1965 Darban Zom 7220m     
Wildalmkirchl, South traverse 
1982 Muztagh Ata 7546m, 3rd ascent, new route

Books 

Marcus Schmuck wrote the following book:

 Broad Peak 8047m Meine Bergfahrten mit Hermann Buhl, 1958. German published by Verlag "Das Bergland-buch" in Salzburg/Stuttgart.

References

External links
Team member of Austrian OEAV Karakoram expedition 1957
Skil Brum on Summitpost.org

1925 births
2005 deaths
Austrian mountain climbers